Janjira Janchome, nicknamed Lukejan is a beauty queen from Phitsanulok, Thailand, who won the Miss Thailand Universe pageant in 2002.

Janchome was born and raised in Phitsanulok province by her parents. She received a bachelor's degree and master's degree from Kasetsart University in Bangkok. In 2015, she graduated with a PhD of Science form Chulalongkorn University in Bangkok.

Pageantry
Janchome was crowned Miss Thailand Universe on March 23, 2002, in Bangkok.

She went on to compete unsuccessfully in the Miss Universe 2002 pageant held at Coliseo Roberto Clemente, San Juan, Puerto Rico, on May 29, 2002. From the 75 contestants from around the world who competed, the winner was Miss Russia, Oxana Fedorova who later was replaced by Justine Pasek of Panama.

References

External links
Crowning Moment

1983 births
Living people
Miss Universe 2002 contestants
Janjira Janchome
Janjira Janchome
Janjira Janchome
Janjira Janchome